Chatham Charter High School is a charter school in Siler City, North Carolina serving student from kindergarten through high school. The school sits on 39 acres and a 43,000 square foot facility.  The education for grades 9–12 is a middle college model; students take core classes as 9th and 10th graders, then take courses through Central Carolina Community College as 11th and 12th graders. This results in students earning transferable college credits while simultaneously earning their high school diplomas.

History
Chatham Charter was founded in 1996, as one of the first schools to receive a charter from the state.

Athletics

Chatham Charter is a 1A Independent for the North Carolina High School Athletic Association for the 2014–15 year, and will move to a conference in 2015–16. School sports include men's and women's cross country, men's and women's soccer, men's and women's basketball, softball, baseball, men's and women's tennis, golf, and volleyball.

2013 establishments in North Carolina
Charter schools in North Carolina
Educational institutions established in 2013
Public high schools in North Carolina
Schools in Chatham County, North Carolina